Winter Season is a 2022 Russian drama film directed by Svetlana Ustinova. The main characters of the film were played by Yuliya Snigir and Yevgenia Dobrovolskaya.

It is scheduled to be theatrically released on November 24, 2022, by Capella Film.

Plot 
Katya and her mother have a tense relationship. And suddenly Katya finds out that her mother has suddenly disappeared. After Katya was told the reason for the disappearance of her mother, Katya will have to reunite with her mother and discover a lot of new things about her and about herself.

Cast 
 Yuliya Snigir as Katya
 Sofya Petrova as Katya, a little girl
 Yevgenia Dobrovolskaya as Katya's mother
 Yekarina Varnava as Ilza
 Semyon Serzin as Stasik
 Aleksandr Lykov as Georgy
 Artur Vakha as Nikolay
 Aleksandra Babaskina as Maya
 Polina Raykina as Tamara

Production
The filming of the film was started by Hype Film in the spring of 2021 and took place in Saint Petersburg. The film was directed by Svetlana Ustinova, making her debut in this role. The script, written by Igor Poplaukhin, is partly based on the life of the actress herself.

References

External links 
 

2022 films
2022 drama films
2020s Russian-language films
Russian drama films
Films about mother–daughter relationships
Films shot in Saint Petersburg